The 1990 All-Ireland Junior Hurling Championship was the 60th staging of the All-Ireland Junior Championship, the Gaelic Athletic Association's second tier Gaelic football championship.

Cork entered the championship as the defending champions.

The All-Ireland final was played on 9 September 1990 at Páirc Uí Chaoimh in Cork, between Cork and Warwickshire, in what was their sixth meeting in the final and a second meeting in succession. Cork won the match by 3-16 to 0-08 to claim their ninth championship title overall and a second consecutive title.

Results

Leinster Junior Football Championship

Leinster quarter-finals

Leinster semi-finals

Leinster final

Munster Junior Football Championship

Munster quarter-finals

Munster semi-finals

Munster final

All-Ireland Junior Football Championship

All-Ireland home final

All-Ireland final

References

Junior
All-Ireland Junior Football Championship